Your Desire Is Sin (German: Dein Begehren ist Sünde ...) is a 1925 German silent drama film directed by Franz Seitz and starring Maria Mindzenty, Otto Framer and John Mylong.

The film's sets were designed by the art director Max Heilbronn. It was shot at the Emelka Studios in Munich.

Cast
 Maria Mindzenty as Schwester Beate 
 Otto Framer as Henrik Kellquist 
 John Mylong as Felix Dubois 
 Ferdinand Martini as Dr. Moebius 
 Georg H. Schnell
 Max Weydner

References

Bibliography
 Paolo Caneppele. Entscheidungen der Wiener Filmzensur: 1922-1925. Filmarchiv Austria, 2002.

External links

1925 films
Films of the Weimar Republic
Films directed by Franz Seitz
German silent feature films
Films shot at Bavaria Studios
Bavaria Film films
1925 drama films
German drama films
Silent drama films
1920s German films